Monagead is a townland in County Westmeath, Ireland.

Monagead is one of 35 townlands of the civil parish of Street in the barony of Moygoish in the Province of Leinster. The southern boundary of the townland is formed by the River Inny.

Geography
The neighbouring townlands are: Clonkeen and Derradd to the north, Hospitalbank to the east, Ballyharney to the south and Garriskil to the west.

Population
In the 1911 census of Ireland there was 1 house and 1 inhabitant in the townland.

References

External links
Map of Monagead at openstreetmap.org
Monagead at the IreAtlas Townland Data Base
Monagead at Townlands.ie
Monagead at The Placenames Database of Ireland, Department of Arts, Heritage and the Gaeltacht

Townlands of County Westmeath